The Dibang Dam is a planned concrete gravity dam, located in the Lower Dibang Valley District in Arunachal Pradesh, India. The Dibang Dam is expected to provide up to 3,000 megawatts of hydroelectric power and will also assist with flood control in the Dibang Valley.

History
The foundation stone for the dam was laid on 31 January 2008 by Prime Minister Manmohan Singh. Construction on the project, however, has yet to begin. In 2013, the Ministry of Environment and Forests rejected the project's application but NHPC Limited resubmitted it in 2014. The dam has also been under intense local and international opposition to its tentative negative environmental impacts and forced relocations of Idu Mishmi tribal peoples.

The Modi government gave a renewed go-ahead for the project in 2019. The main purpose of the project will be flood control and electricity generation. As of 2020, work was not progressing on either of the two major dam projects in the Assam region, the Dibang and the Lower Subansiri.

References

External links
Dibang Project at NHPC

Hydroelectric power stations in Arunachal Pradesh
Dams in Arunachal Pradesh
Proposed hydroelectric power stations
Dams in the Brahmaputra River Basin
Proposed renewable energy power stations in India